Sten De Geer was a Swedish professor of geography and ethnography. As son of geologist Gerard De Geer Sten was born into the Swedish nobility holding the title of baron.

1886 births
1933 deaths
Swedish geographers
Swedish ethnographers
Academic staff of the University of Gothenburg
20th-century geographers
Swedish people of Belgian descent
Sten